

There are 307 properties and districts listed on the National Register of Historic Places in Denver, the capital of the U.S. state of Colorado.

Number of listings by region
The properties are distributed across 48 of Denver's 79 official neighborhoods. For the purposes of this list, the city is split into four regions: West Denver, which includes all of the city west of the South Platte River; Downtown Denver, which includes the neighborhoods of Capitol Hill, Central Business District, Civic Center, Five Points, North Capitol Hill, and Union Station; and Northeast and Southeast Denver, which include the parts of the city east of the South Platte River (outside of Downtown Denver) that are north and south of Sixth Avenue respectively. Five sites are included in multiple regions.

See also 

 List of National Historic Landmarks in Colorado
 National Register of Historic Places listings in Colorado

References

Buildings and structures in Denver
 Directory